James Dinwiddie may refer to:
 James Dinwiddie (surgeon), American Confederate military surgeon
 James Dinwiddie (astronomer), Scottish physicist, astronomer, inventor and natural philosopher
 James A. Dinwiddie, member of the Virginia Senate

See also
 James M. Dinwiddie House, near Dover, Lafayette County, Missouri.